Bryan Lee Vera (born December 28, 1981) is an American professional boxer currently competing as a super middleweight. He is best known for his memorable and notable victories over then-undefeated Andy Lee in 2008, former world champion Sergio Mora (twice, in 2011 and 2012) and Serhiy Dzinziruk in 2013. Vera currently trains in Cedar Park, Texas.

Personal
Vera attended Westwood High School and lettered in football, a sport he had played since a child in Pop Warner. His brother, Gilbert "Boogie" Vera is also a professional boxer and his father was a two-time IBA champion in the heavyweight division.

Amateur career

Vera's amateur career saw him clash with (among others), Jonathon Banks (in a losing effort), and then saw him returning in December 2005 (after beginning his professional career in 2004), when he returned for one last amateur fight against Ivan Stovell (in a losing effort).

Professional career
Vera began his professional career in 2004 with a four-round unanimous decision win over Avien Cooper.  He would win his next thirteen bouts, including a decision victory over Darnell Boone (who would later knockout the future lineal light heavyweight champion Adonis Stevenson), before signing up with the ESPN television series The Contender.

The Contender
He is one of the featured boxers on the third season of the boxing reality TV series, The Contender, which premiered September 4, 2007, on ESPN. Vera suffered his first professional loss in the opening fight of the contest to the shows runner-up Jaidon Codrington.

Vera vs. Lee
In 2008, Vera fought then-undefeated and highly touted prospect Andy Lee. In a fight that he was supposed to lose according to most critics, Brian Vera pulled up the upset win and would defeat Lee by TKO in the seventh round. Although the stoppage was regarded as controversial, Vera was behind on points up until that point, though Lee himself appeared to be battered and exhausted from Vera's relentless assault in the 7th.

Vera vs. Kirkland
Vera's career would hit a standstill soon after when he was matched against light-middleweight contender James Kirkland.  Kirkland was vicious in his assault against Vera, battering his outmatched opponent all over the ring for the duration of the fight.  Vera was knocked down twice in preceding rounds before the faithful eight round, in which a devastating combination from Kirkland put Vera down for a third time.  Vera managed to rise up, but was immediately cornered and beaten on until referee Vic Drakulich called a halt to the match, with Vera losing by an eighth-round technical knockout.  In the match, Kirkland had managed to land 283 out of 532 thrown punches, whereas Vera only landed 64 out of 470.

Vera only fought once in 2009, losing a definitive decision to Craig McEwan.  McEwan was landing combinations nearly at will from the start of the fight, and Vera had no answer for his opponent's boxing ability.  In 2010 Vera would go 1-2, first losing a unanimous decision against Isaac Rodrigues before scoring a third-round technical knockout over Sebastien Demers, and finally dropping a twelve-round unanimous decision to middleweight contender Max Bursak.

On February 4, 2011, Vera would defeat fellow Contender competitor Sergio Mora.  Vera would win a close but definitive split decision over Mora, and followed up his success with an eighth-round knockout over Eloy Suarez.

Vera vs. Lee II
Later that year Vera would rematch his old foe Andy Lee, this time losing by a wide margin.  Lee used his height and reach to excellent effect, keeping the bullish Vera off of him all night, and even scoring a knockdown in the second. Lee displayed excellent boxing tactics and skills by controlling the distance of the fight and continuously blasting Vera with power punches from all angles.

Vera vs. Chávez Jr. I-II
Vera would score four more wins following his defeat to Andy Lee, including a wide unanimous decision against former foe Sergio Mora, as well as a technical knockout victory over Serhiy Dzinziruk before being matched against former WBC middleweight champion Julio César Chávez, Jr.  Vera surprised many when he dominated the bout, easily outboxing and out-landing his much larger and sluggish foe.  When it was announced after the fight that Chavez had won a unanimous decision, the decision was roundly booed.  It was later revealed that not one press row scorer had scored the bout for Chávez Jr., all scoring it definitively for Vera.

Chávez Jr. and Vera would rematch six months later over a twelve-round bout.  This time Chavez would use his size and strength more effectively, outboxing and outscoring Vera with relative ease.  Vera would lose a far clearer unanimous decision.

Professional boxing record

| style="text-align:center;" colspan="8"|26 Wins (16 Knockouts, 10 Decisions), 16 Losses, 0 Draws
|-style="text-align:center; background:#e3e3e3;"
|style="border-style:none none solid solid; "|Res.
|style="border-style:none none solid solid; "|Record
|style="border-style:none none solid solid; "|Opponent
|style="border-style:none none solid solid; "|Type
|style="border-style:none none solid solid; "|Round
|style="border-style:none none solid solid; "|Date
|style="border-style:none none solid solid; "|Location
|style="border-style:none none solid solid; "|Notes
|- align=center
|Loss
|26-16
|align=left| Ahmed Elbiali
|
|
|
|align=left|
|
|- align=center
|Loss
|26-15
|align=left| Marcus McDaniel
|
|
|
|align=left|
|
|- align=center
|Loss
|26-14
|align=left| Sena Agbeko
|
|
|
|align=left|
|
|- align=center
|Loss
|26-13
|align=left| Jas Phipps
|
|
|
|align=left|
|
|- align=center
|Loss
|26-12
|align=left| Mike Gavronski
|
|
|
|align=left|
|
|- align=center
|Win
|26-11
|align=left| Milton Nuñez
|
|
|
|align=left|
|
|- align=center
|Win
|25-11
|align=left| Larry Smith
|
|
|
|align=left|
|
|- align=center
|Win
|24-11
|align=left| Juan Carlos Rojas
|
|
|
|align=left|
|
|- align=center
|Loss
|23-11
|align=left| Matvey Korobov
|
|
|
|align=left|
|
|- align=center
|Loss
|23-10
|align=left| Rocky Fielding
|
|
|
|align=left|
|align=left|
|- align=center
|Loss
|23-9
|align=left| Willie Monroe Jr.
|
|
|
|align=left|
|align=left|
|- align=center
|Loss
|23-8
|align=left| Julio César Chávez Jr.
|
|
|
|align=left|
|align=left|
|- align=center
|Loss
|23-7
|align=left| Julio César Chávez Jr.
|
|
|
|align=left|
|align=left|
|- align=center
|Win
|23-6
|align=left| Donatas Bondorovas
|
|
|
|align=left|
|align=left|
|- align=center
|Win
|22-6
|align=left| Serhiy Dzinziruk
|
|
|
|align=left|
|align=left|
|- align=center
|Win
|21-6
|align=left| Sergio Mora
|
|
|
|align=left|
|align=left|
|- align=center
|Win
|20-6
|align=left| Taronze Washington
|
|
|
|align=left|
|align=left|
|- align=center
|Loss
|19-6
|align=left| Andy Lee
|
|
|
|align=left|
|align=left|
|- align=center
|Win
|19-5
|align=left| Eloy Suarez
|
|
|
|align=left|
|align=left|
|- align=center
|Win
|18-5
|align=left| Sergio Mora
|
|
|
|align=left|
|align=left|
|- align=center
|Loss
|17-5
|align=left| Max Bursak
|
|
|
|align=left|
|align=left|
|- align=center
|Win
|17-4
|align=left| Sebastien Demers
|
|
|
|align=left|
|align=left|
|- align=center
|Loss
|16-4
|align=left| Isaac Rodrigues
|
|
|
|align=left|
|align=left|
|- align=center
|Loss
|16-3
|align=left| Craig McEwan
|
|
|
|align=left|
|align=left|
|- align=center
|Loss
|16-2
|align=left| James Kirkland
|
|
|
|align=left|
|align=left|
|- align=center
|Win
|16-1
|align=left| Andy Lee
|
|
|
|align=left|
|align=left|
|- align=center
|Win
|15-1
|align=left| Max Alexander
|
|
|
|align=left|
|align=left|
|- align=center
|Loss
|14-1
|align=left| Jaidon Codrington
|
|
|
|align=left|
|align=left|
|- align=center
|Win
|14-0
|align=left| Darnell Boone
|
|
|
|align=left|
|align=left|
|- align=center
|Win
|13-0
|align=left| Samuel Miller
|
|
|
|align=left|
|align=left|
|- align=center
|Win
|12-0
|align=left| Etianne Whitaker
|
|
|
|align=left|
|align=left|
|- align=center
|Win
|11-0
|align=left| Antonio Garcia
|
|
|
|align=left|
|align=left|
|- align=center
|Win
|10-0
|align=left| Marcus Hicks
|
|
|
|align=left|
|align=left|
|- align=center
|Win
|9-0
|align=left| Antonio Garcia
|
|
|
|align=left|
|align=left|
|- align=center
|Win
|8-0
|align=left| Jeremiah Chapman
|
|
|
|align=left|
|align=left|
|- align=center
|Win
|7-0
|align=left| Cardyl Finley
|
|
|
|align=left|
|align=left|
|- align=center
|Win
|6-0
|align=left| Freeman Taft
|
|
|
|align=left|
|align=left|
|- align=center
|Win
|5-0
|align=left| Trenice Brown
|
|
|
|align=left|
|align=left|
|- align=center
|Win
|4-0
|align=left| Javier Diaz
|
|
|
|align=left|
|align=left|
|- align=center
|Win
|3-0
|align=left| Juan Jose Ruiz
|
|
|
|align=left|
|align=left|
|- align=center
|Win
|2-0
|align=left| Bert Montez
|
|
|
|align=left|
|align=left|
|- align=center
|Win
|1-0
|align=left| Avien Cooper
|
|
|
|align=left|
|align=left|

Big Knockout Boxing record

|-
|align="center" colspan=9|0 Wins, 1 Loss, 0 Draws
|-
| align="center" style="border-style: none none solid solid; background: #e3e3e3"|Res.
| align="center" style="border-style: none none solid solid; background: #e3e3e3"|Record
| align="center" style="border-style: none none solid solid; background: #e3e3e3"|Opponent
| align="center" style="border-style: none none solid solid; background: #e3e3e3"|Type
| align="center" style="border-style: none none solid solid; background: #e3e3e3"|Rd, Time
| align="center" style="border-style: none none solid solid; background: #e3e3e3"|Date
| align="center" style="border-style: none none solid solid; background: #e3e3e3"|Location
| align="center" style="border-style: none none solid solid; background: #e3e3e3"|Event
| align="center" style="border-style: none none solid solid; background: #e3e3e3"|Notes
|-align=center
|Loss
| 0-1
| align=left| Gabriel Rosado
|  ||||
|align=left| 
|align=left|
|align=left|

References

External links

Brian Vera on Myspace

American boxers of Mexican descent
Sportspeople from Austin, Texas
1981 births
Living people
People from Cedar Park, Texas
The Contender (TV series) participants
People from Fort Worth, Texas
American male boxers
Super-middleweight boxers